Zepparella is an all-female American Led Zeppelin tribute band founded and formed in 2005 in San Francisco, California, by the band's drummer, Clementine. The current band consists of lead vocalist Anna Kristina, guitarist Gretchen Menn, bassist Holly West, and drummer Clementine.

The original members were Anna Kristina, Gretchen Menn, Nila Minnerok and Clementine. In 2011 the lead vocal was replaced by Miaya Shambry and the bass player by Angeline Saris; soon after the lead vocal changed again and Noelle Doughty took the place. In 2017 Anna Kristina came back as lead vocal and after some time Angeline Saris decided to leave the band because she had many other project so she was replaced by Holly West.

Zepparella released a self-titled 10-song studio album in 2014. and three live albums, Live at 19 Broadway in 2005; A Pleasing Pounding on WhatAreRecords? in 2010,  and Live at Sweetwater in 2016

The band has produced several videos. "When the Levee Breaks," was released in 2010 with over 20 million YouTube views; "Dazed and Confused," released in 2012, with over 1.8 million YouTube views; and "Kashmir," released in 2019, with over 1 million YouTube views.

Steve Vai performed with Zepparella at the Malibu Guitar Festival in Malibu, California on May 19, 2017.

Equipment
Gretchen Menn - Lead Guitar: Music Man Silhouette and Silhouette Special; Sadowsky Nylon String Electric; DiMarzio Pickups, cables, straps; Bi-Onyx amp and cabinet; Engl Special Edition E 670 EL 34 1977 Marshall JMP amp; Providence guitar effects pedals

Clementine - Drummer: 1973 Ludwig kit, 24-20-18-14. Paiste Bonham reissue; Paiste 2002 cymbals; Ludwig SupraPhonic snare.

Discography
Live at 19 Broadway - live (2005)
A Pleasing Pounding - live (2010)
Zepparella - a 10-song studio album (2014)
Live at Sweetwater - live (2016)

References

External links

 
 
 Vintage Guitar Magazine interview with Gretchen Menn

All-female tribute bands
Led Zeppelin tribute bands
Musical groups from San Francisco
Musical groups established in 2005
Hard rock musical groups from California
Musical quartets
2005 establishments in California